Otago Central or Central Otago was a parliamentary electorate in the Otago region of New Zealand, from 1911 to 1919 as Otago Central; from 1928 to 1957 as Central Otago; and from 1957 to 1978 as Otago Central.  It was replaced by the Otago electorate. The electorate was represented by six Members of Parliament.

Population centres
In the 1911 electoral redistribution, the North Island gained a further seat from the South Island due to faster population growth. In addition, there were substantial population movements within each island, and significant changes resulted from this. Only four electorates were unaltered, five electorates were abolished, one former electorate was re-established, and four electorates, including Otago Central, were created for the first time. Settlements that fell within the original Otago Central electorate included Roxburgh, Alexandra, and Ranfurly.

In the 1918 electoral redistribution, the Otago Central electorate was abolished.

In the 1927 electoral redistribution, the North Island gained a further electorate from the South Island due to faster population growth. Five electorates were abolished, two former electorates, including Central Otago, were re-established, and three electorates were created for the first time.

History
The first representative of the Otago Central electorate was Robert Scott, who was the incumbent from the Tuapeka electorate.

Members of Parliament
The Otago Central electorate was represented by six Members of Parliament:

Key

Election results

1975 election

1972 election

1969 election

1966 election

1963 election

1960 election

1957 election

1954 election

1951 election

1949 election

1946 election

1943 election
There were three candidates in 1943, with the election won by William Bodkin over James McIndoe Mackay.

1931 election

1928 election

Notes

References

Historical electorates of New Zealand
1911 establishments in New Zealand
1928 establishments in New Zealand
1919 disestablishments in New Zealand
1978 disestablishments in New Zealand
Politics of Otago